Middelkerke is a municipality located in the Belgian province of West Flanders, on the North Sea, west of Ostend. The municipality comprises the villages of Leffinge, Lombardsijde, Mannekensvere, Middelkerke proper, Schore, Sint-Pieters-Kapelle, Slijpe, Westende and Wilskerke. On January 1, 2006, Middelkerke had a total population of 17,841. The total area is 75.65 km2 which gives a population density of 236 inhabitants per km2.

The first reference of 'Middelkerca' is found in 1218. Before 1876 it mainly was a farming settlement.

In 1902, Middlekerke became the world's first municipality to have their drinking water disinfected by continuous chlorination.

Sports
The Noordzeecross is a February cyclo-cross race held in Middelkerke, which is part of the Superprestige.

References

External links

Official website 

 
Sub-municipalities of Middelkerke
Municipalities of West Flanders